Roger Clavet (born February 8, 1953) is a Canadian politician from Quebec. A journalist, he was first elected to the House of Commons of Canada in the 2004 Canadian federal election. He was a member of the Bloc Québécois for the riding of Louis-Hébert.  He was the Bloc's critic of Asia-Pacific.  He was defeated in the 2006 federal election.

Clavet was born in Quebec City, Quebec.

References

External links
How'd They Vote?: Roger Clavet's voting history and quotes
 

1953 births
Bloc Québécois MPs
French Quebecers
Living people
Members of the House of Commons of Canada from Quebec
Politicians from Quebec City
21st-century Canadian politicians